Phulbari is a village in Dhangadhi sub-metropolitan city and former village development committee in Kailali District in Sudurpashchim Province of Nepal. At the time of the 2011 Nepal census it had a population of 20,508 living in 3,844 individual households.

References

External links
UN map of the municipalities of Kailali District

Populated places in Kailali District